Bathybuccinum higuchii is a species of sea snail, a marine gastropod mollusc in the family Buccinidae, the true whelks.

Description

Distribution
This marine species occurs off Japan.

References

 Fraussen K. & Chino, M., 2009. - The deep-water genera Bathybuccinum and Ovulatibuccinum Golikov & Sirenko, 1988 (Gastropoda: Buccinidae) in Japan and adjacent waters, with description of three new species. Venus 67(3-4): 145-157
 Hasegawa K. (2009) Upper bathyal gastropods of the Pacific coast of northern Honshu, Japan, chiefly collected by R/V Wakataka-maru. In: T. Fujita (ed.), Deep-sea fauna and pollutants off Pacific coast of northern Japan. National Museum of Nature and Science Monographs 39: 225-383

External links

Buccinidae
Gastropods described in 2009